Xainza County, also Shantsa, Shentsa, is a county within Nagqu of the Tibet Autonomous Region of China. In 1999 the county had a population of 16,190.

Geography

The capital lies at Naktsang Town or Xainza. Until recent times the County extended all the way from the borders of Xinjiang in the north to the Brahmaputra River in the south, covering a larger area than the United Kingdom. It has since been split into two, Shentsa (Xainza) County and the new Nyima County to the east.
"In this region there are 67 lakes, including some of Tibet's largest: Serling, Dangra Yutso, Ngangtse-tso, Kering-tso, Taktse-tse and Uru-tso. In the northeast there are a number of 6,000 m peaks including Purok Gangri  and Norla Gangri , not to mention the Kunlun mountains on the Xinjiang border further north. The entire northern region forms part of the Jangtang Nature Reserve. Ten large salt fields testify to the importance of this region for the traditional trading commodity of the Jangtang Plateau."

Lakes in close proximity to the main town are Geren Lake, Mujiu Lake, Anzi Lake, Guomang Lake, Cuo'e and Ziguii Lake, Wuru Lake, Siling Lake and Bangecuo. The  reserve was established in 1993 and contains significant populations of black-necked cranes and some 120 species of birds in total. Tibetan sheep, wild donkey, argali, snow leopards, bar-headed goose, etc., also inhabit the county.

Climate

Xainza has an extreme subarctic climate, bordering on polar. The climate of the county is typical of a plateau climate zone,  with thin, cold air and a dry climate, with 279.1 days of frost per year on average.

Geology
The county has been geologically well assessed in publications. Xainza contains an Ordovician to Silurian stratigraphic succession and the area is part of the Xainza-Jiali Fault Zone. Significant Triassic clastic deposits with gypsum beds and volcanic clastics have been found between Xainza and Coqên. Early Devonian (Pragian-Emsian) rocks in Xainza County are said to "yield a shallow-marine, carbonate-platform fauna of corals, brachiopods, dacryoconarids, nautiloids and conodonts."

Economy
Animal husbandry is the chief source of income in the county. Jiagang Hydropower Station was built in the 1990s and as of 2008 serves about 20,000 nomadic households across the county. Gold mining in the county has reportedly affected water quality and some area of grassland. An alluvial gold mine which generated "5 million yuan (US$617,300) of the county's 8.5-million budgetary income" was slated to be shut down in 2005. Other reserves include iron, lead, copper, salt, borax and phosphorus. The county has a reported geothermal resources area of about 100,000 square meters and is rich in fish resources.

Townships
The county contains the following towns and townships, 8 township-level divisions in total. These in turn are divided into 73 village committees.
"The county capital of Shentsa is located at Naktsang (Shentsa), 805 km from Lumaringpo in Gertse county, and 232 km from Palgon. However, due to the vastness of this region, there is a third administrative centre at Tsonyi (Twin Lakes) in the north. Naktsang (Shentsa) to Tsonyi is 442 km."

 Xainza Town (ཤན་རྩ་, 申扎镇), 
 Xiongmei Town (གཞུང་སྨད་, 雄梅镇)
 Mar'yo Township (མར་ཡོ་, 马跃乡)
 Mepa Township (སྨད་པ་, 买巴乡)
 Tarma Township (ཐར་མ་, 塔尔玛乡)
 Zhago Township (བཞ་སྒོ་, 下过乡)
 Khyak Township (འཁྱག་, 恰乡)
 Patra Township (པ་བཀྲ་, 巴扎乡)

References

Citations

Sources 
 Dorje, Gyurme. (2009) Footprint Tibet Handbook. 4th Edition. Bath, U.K.

External links
Hudong Encyclopedia
Photo of Xainza Town
Photo of Xainza Nature Reserve
Photo of Xainza Nature Reserve
Photo of Japgang Power Station

 
Counties of Tibet
Nagqu